Flamur Ruçi (born 19 January 2002) is an Albanian professional footballer who plays as a midfielder for Kategoria Superiore club Bylis and the Albania national U21 team.

Career statistics

Club

Notes

References

External links
 Profile - Albanian Football Association
 Profile - UEFA
 Profile - ESPN

2002 births
Living people
Sportspeople from Berat
Albanian footballers
Association football midfielders
FK Tomori Berat players
Luftëtari Gjirokastër players
KF Bylis Ballsh players
Kategoria e Parë players
Kategoria Superiore players